Eupogonius cryptus is a species of beetle in the family Cerambycidae. It was described by Hovore in 1989. It is known from Costa Rica.

References

Eupogonius
Beetles described in 1989